Hexagon is the sixth studio album by American alternative rock band Filligar. It was released in July 2013 in the United States and September 2013 in the United Kingdom. The title refers to the shape of the cube on the cover, rendered as a hexagon in 2D space.

The album was written in piecemeal while the band was touring in support of their previous album The Nerve. Most of the actual recording was done at Electrical Audio in Chicago.

Reception

The album received mixed reviews. Mack Hayden of Paste described the album as "a fun time" that "isn’t going to make any headlines". Connect Savannah magazine described it as having "real soul". Both made comparisons to another Chicago-based band, Wilco. Michael Roffman of Consequence of Sound described it as a "harmless album from a harmless band that’s received harmless press".

Personnel
Johnny Mathias – guitar and vocals
Teddy Mathias – bass guitar and backing vocals
Pete Mathias – drums
Casey Gibson – keyboards  and backing vocals

Production
Filligar – production
Greg Norman – engineering, mixing
Shawn Dealey – engineering, mixing

Track listing

References
 

2013 albums
Filligar albums